Paul Kok (born 21 December 1994) is a Dutch footballer who plays as a left back for VV Katwijk in the Tweede Divisie. He formerly played on loan for Telstar whilst being at AZ and later for FC Oss.

Career
Kok did not make one appearance for AZ first team and was loaned to Eerste Divisie side Telstar for the 2013–14 season.

On loan at the club Kok played 31 times in the season primarily as a left back, the club finished 15th out of the 20 team division and had the second worst defence in the league, Achilles '29 had the honour of conceding the most goals.

Kok joined Oss on a free transfer after his contract expired at AZ and signed a one-year contract with an option of an additional year.

On 27 September 2019, Kok signed with Tweede Divisie club Koninklijke HFC. After one season there, he joined fellow Tweede Divisie club VV Katwijk after having signing a pre-contract in January 2020.

References

External links
 
 

1994 births
Living people
Dutch footballers
SC Telstar players
TOP Oss players
FC Volendam players
Eerste Divisie players
People from Hoorn
Association football fullbacks
AZ Alkmaar players
VV Katwijk players
Tweede Divisie players
VV De Zouaven players
Footballers from North Holland